Ardrossan Civic Centre is a municipal building in Glasgow Street, Ardrossan, North Ayrshire, Scotland. The building, which is largely used as a community events venue, is a Category B listed building.

History

Following significant growth in population, largely associated with the status of Ardrossan as a seaport, the area became a burgh in 1846. In this context the new burgh leaders decided to commission a town hall: the site they selected was at the corner of Harbour Street and Princes Street. The foundation stone for the new building was laid by the factor of the Eglinton Castle estate, George Johnstone Redburn, with full masonic honours, on 30 October 1858.

The old town hall was designed in the neoclassical style, built in red sandstone and completed in around 1859. The design involved an asymmetrical frontage extending for four bays along each of the two streets. It was fenestrated with casement windows on the ground floor and pedimented sash windows on the first floor and there was a parapet above. A clock, with a stone surround and an acroterion above, was presented by the then provost, John Hogarth, and unveiled at the corner of the building above the parapet in June 1887. Ardrossan Burgh Council sold the old town hall to the local masonic lodge, in an exchange of properties, in August 1946.

The current building in Glasgow Street was commissioned by a new inhabitant to the town from the north of Scotland, Duncan Graham, as a private house, in the mid-19th century. It was designed in the Gothic Revival style, built in pink rubble masonry with stone dressings and completed in 1851. The design involved a symmetrical main frontage with three bays facing onto Glasgow Street with the outer bays bowed and battlemented; the central bay featured a doorway with a pointed stone surround which was flanked by lancet windows; there were two round headed windows on the first floor and the outer bays featured mullioned windows on both floors. The building, which was originally known as Graham's Castle, was acquired by a colliery owner, Archibald Russell, in 1893. In 1920, it was bought by the Ardrossan Dry Dock and Shipbuilding Company which refurbished it and operated it as the Castlecraigs Recreation Club, before selling it to the local masonic lodge in 1927.

After being requisitioned and serving as naval barracks during the Second World War, it was acquired by Ardrossan Burgh Council, in an exchange of properties, in August 1946. It operated as the meeting place of the local burgh council but ceased to be the local seat of government when the enlarged Cunninghame District Council was formed in Irvine in 1975. It was extended to the south west to create an enlarged complex known as the "Ardrossan Civic Centre" in 1978.

In November 2016, a large audience attended a meeting in the civic centre to provide support to a campaign led by North Ayrshire Council, which was ultimately successful, to ensure that the drive-through ferry MV Isle of Arran continued to operate the route from Ardrossan to Brodick on the Isle of Arran, thereby abandoning proposals to change the port of departure from Ardrossan to Troon. A programme of refurbishment works, which included replacement of the windows, was completed in spring 2018.

See also
 List of listed buildings in Ardrossan, North Ayrshire

References

Government buildings completed in 1851
City chambers and town halls in Scotland
Category B listed buildings in North Ayrshire
Ardrossan−Saltcoats−Stevenston